The 1957–58 Michigan Wolverines men's basketball team represented the University of Michigan in intercollegiate basketball during the 1957–58 season.  The team finished the season in seventh place in the Big Ten Conference with an overall record of 11–11 and 6–8 against conference opponents.

William Perigo was in his sixth year as the team's head coach.  Senior Pete Tillotson was the team's leading scorer with 415 points in 22 games for an average of 18.8 points per game.  Tillotson also served as the team's captain and was selected as the Most Valuable Player.

Statistical leaders

Team players drafted into the NBA
Three players from this team were selected in the NBA Draft.

References

Michigan
Michigan Wolverines men's basketball seasons
Michigan Wolverines basketball
Michigan Wolverines basketball